The 2021 South Australian National Football League season (officially the SANFL Statewide Super League) was the 142nd season of the South Australian National Football League (SANFL), the highest-level Australian rules football competition in South Australia. The season commenced on 1 April and concluded with the Grand Final on 3 October.

Fixtures 
Four matches were played on Good Friday for the first time in a blockbuster start to the 2021 SANFL Statewide Super League.

Arch-rivals Norwood and Port Adelaide kicked the season off under lights in front of the Redlegs’ new Wolf Blass Community Centre at The Parade on Easter Thursday.

It loomed as a fascinating encounter before the remaining eight clubs collided on Friday April 2 in an historic occasion for the competition.

Reigning premier Woodville-West Torrens unfurled its 2020 premiership flag in front of its faithful against Sturt at Maughan Thiem Kia Oval while Glenelg hosted West Adelaide at ACH Group Stadium in the twilight timeslot of 4.10pm.

Central District defended its home turf against regular Good Friday combatant North Adelaide at X Convenience Oval while South Adelaide's star recruit Bryce Gibbs faced his former teammates against Adelaide at Flinders University Stadium.

 Source: Click here

Round 1

Round 2

Round 3

Round 4

Round 5

Round 6

State Game

Round 7

Round 8

Round 9

Round 10

Round 11

Round 12

Round 13

Round 14

Round 15

Round 16

Round 17

Round 18

Round 19

Ladder

Finals series

Qualifying and Elimination Finals

Semi-finals

Preliminary final

Grand Final

See also
 2021 SANFL Women's League season

References 

South Australian National Football League seasons
SANFL